Beloje (839) was the Serbian župan of Travunia some time in the first half of the 9th century. Travunia was a polity centered in Trebinje (now in southern Bosnia and Herzegovina), subject to the Principality of Serbia. Mentioned in De Administrando Imperio of Byzantine Emperor Constantine VII (r. 945–959), Beloje was a contemporary of Serbian ruler Vlastimir (r. 836–851). It is unknown how he came to the position; it might have been through the primogeniture principles, however, there is no definite answer. Vlastimir married his daughter to Beloje's son Krajina, and "desiring to ennoble his son-in-law", elevated his rank to archon (prince) and made him independent. Travunia was thus elevated from a župa into an archonty (principality), practically independent, while Vlastimir oversaw his son-in-law. T. Živković theorized that Beloje sought to free himself of Serbian rule, and that Vlastimir prevented this through a political marriage between the two families, possibly prior to the Bulgar–Serb War (839–842). Krajina's descendants were entitled the rule of Travunia under Serbian suzerainty.

There is a hypothesis that the legendary king Pavlimir Belo (or Belimir) mentioned in the Chronicle of the Priest of Duklja was possibly based on Beloje. The CPD is a source dating to ca. 1300–10 largely discredited in historiography (events in the Early Middle Ages deemed useless). The CPD mentions this individual, Belo, as being born as Pavlimir, receiving his nickname from his relatives and other Romans from bello, "because he very much loved war". The legend of Pavlimir-Belo continues with his stint at Syrmia, where he defeated the Syrmians and Hungarians, and his defeat of Rascian župan Ljutomir. Belo is mentioned in the CPD as a Rascian župan, while DAI mentions Beloje as a Travunian župan. N. Banašević noted that while the two names were similar, they were not identical.

Annotations

References

Sources

  
 

 
 
 
 
 
  
 
 
 
 
 

9th-century rulers in Europe
9th-century Serbian nobility
Principality of Serbia (early medieval)
History of Herzegovina
Trebinje
People from Trebinje
History of the Serbs of Bosnia and Herzegovina